Below is a list of those who have held the office of Governor of the Isle of Wight in England.  Lord Mottistone was the last lord lieutenant to hold the title governor, from 1992 to 1995; since then there has been no governor appointed.

Governors of the Isle of Wight

1509–1520: Sir Nicholas Wadham (1472-1542) of Merryfield and Edge, "Captain of the Isle of Wight".
1520–1538: Sir James Worsley
1538–1540: Thomas Cromwell, 1st Baron Cromwell (later Earl of Essex)
1540–1553: Richard Worsley
1553–1558: Sir William Girling
1558–1560: William Paulet, 1st Marquess of Winchester
1560–1565: Richard Worsley (reappointed)
1565–1583: Sir Edward Horsey
1583–1603: Sir George Carey, 2nd Lord Hunsdon
1603–1624: Henry Wriothesley, 3rd Earl of Southampton
1633–1642: Jerome Weston, 2nd Earl of Portland
1642–1647: Philip Herbert, 4th Earl of Pembroke
1647–1647: Robert Hammond
1648–1659: Col. William Sydenham
1660: Anthony Ashley Cooper, 1st Earl of Shaftesbury
1660–1661: Jerome Weston, 2nd Earl of Portland
1661–1667: Thomas Colepeper, 2nd Baron Colepeper
1668–1692: Sir Robert Holmes
1693: Hon. Thomas Tollemache
1693–1707: John Cutts, 1st Baron Cutts
1707–1710: Charles Paulet, 2nd Duke of Bolton
1710–1715: General John Richmond Webb
1715–1726: William Cadogan (later Earl Cadogan)
1726–1733: Charles Paulet, 3rd Duke of Bolton
1733–1734: John Montagu, 2nd Duke of Montagu
1734–1742: John Wallop, 1st Viscount Lymington
1742–1746: Charles Paulet, 3rd Duke of Bolton
1746–1762: John Wallop, 1st Earl of Portsmouth
1763–1764: Thomas Holmes, 1st Baron Holmes
1764–1766: Hans Stanley
1766–1770: Harry Paulet, 6th Duke of Bolton
1770–1780: Hans Stanley
1780–1782: Sir Richard Worsley, 7th Baronet
1782–1791: Harry Paulet, 6th Duke of Bolton 
1791–1807: Thomas Orde-Powlett, 1st Baron Bolton 
1807–1841: James Harris, 2nd Earl of Malmesbury
1841–1857: William à Court, 1st Baron Heytesbury
1857–1888: Charles Shaw-Lefevre, 1st Viscount Eversley
1889–1896: Prince Henry of Battenberg
1896–1944: Princess Beatrice of the United Kingdom
1957–1965: Gerald Wellesley, 7th Duke of Wellington
1965–1974: Louis Mountbatten, 1st Earl Mountbatten of Burma (Lord Lieutenant 1974–1979)
1992–1995: David Seely, 4th Baron Mottistone

Lieutenant-governors of the Isle of Wight
c.1689–1693: William Stephens
1694–1701: Joseph Dudley
1702–1710: Anthony Morgan
1710–1714: Henry Holmes
1715–1729: Anthony Morgan
1731–1733: Maurice Morgan
1733–1751: Charles Armand Powlett
1754–1762: Henry Holmes
1763–1766: John Stanwix
?1766–1768: John Mompesson
1768–1795: William Howe, 5th Viscount Howe
1795–1798: Sir Ralph Abercrombie
1798–1808: Sir William Medows
1808–1812: Francis Edward Gwyn
1812–1815: Charles Leigh
1815–1839: Mervyn Archdall

Deputy Governors
1899–1910: Thomas Belhaven Henry Cochrane
1910–1913: Francis John Stuart Hay-Newton
1913–1928: Hallam Tennyson, 2nd Baron Tennyson

See also
Isle of Wight
Lord Lieutenant of the Isle of Wight

References

Sources
The London Gazette
 Robert Walcott, English Politics in the Early Eighteenth Century (Oxford: Oxford University Press, 1956)

Local government on the Isle of Wight
Governors
Wight
Political office-holders in England